"Woju" is a song by Nigerian afropop recording artist Kiss Daniel, released on September 1, 2014 through G-Worldwide Entertainment. Dubbed as "one of the best Nigerian songs of 2014", the song went on to be nominated in the "Hottest Single" category at the 2015 edition of the Nigeria Entertainment Awards.

Critical reception
Upon its release, "Woju" was met with positive reviews from music critics and also received massive airplay. The music video for "Woju" peaked at number one on MTV Base's Official Naija Top 10 music video chart for six weeks, and is regarded as the platform through which Kiss Daniel's music career hit the limelight.

Track listing
 Digital single

Release history

Audio release

Video release

Remix and covers
"Woju" was remixed and covered by several artistes in Nigeria. A freestyle version recorded by 2face Idibia was also leaked online.

Accolades

Woju (Remix)

"Woju (Remix)" is a song by Nigerian afropop artist Kiss Daniel featuring vocals from Tiwa Savage and Davido. The song was released on 28 February 2015 under G-Worldwide Entertainment and was produced by DJ Coublon. Rated as one of the "biggest record in Nigeria" by David Drake of Complex, "Woju (Remix)" made history on MTV Base's Official Naija Top 10 music video chart alongside "Woju" as the first time an original song and its remix would peak at the first and second spots.

Critical reception
The release of "Woju (Remix)" was met with mixed reactions from fans and music critics. Henry Chibuzor of 360Nobs labelled the song “bland, unimproved and surplus to requirement” and further went on to state, “the original “Woju” is on some astronomical shit, and should have been left on that musical high”. tooXclusive's Jim Donnett also voiced his displeasure about the song by stating that, “Woju Remix is perhaps the result of forcing something that you already know wasn’t meant to be”.

Track listing
 Digital single

Release history

Audio release

Video release
The music video for "Woju (Remix)" was shot in Lagos, Nigeria by Adasa Cookey. The video which features guest appearances from Tiwa Savage and Davido was uploaded onto video-sharing website YouTube on 11 March 2015.

References

2014 songs
2015 songs
Kiss Daniel songs
Yoruba-language songs
Songs written by Davido